Regent is a German high-end fashion manufacturer founded in 1946.
It specializes in the manufacturing of handmade men's suits.

History 
Regent was founded in 1946 by Henryk Barig and Michael Aisenstadt in Weißenburg in Bayern, Germany. In the beginning, the company was specialized in producing shirts. 
Shortly after they focused on the production of high quality men's suits.

References

Clothing brands of Germany
Luxury brands
High fashion brands
Suit makers